Bad Boy Club Montréal, also known as BBCM or Fondation BBCM, is a charitable organization established in 1991, based in Montreal, Quebec, Canada. The foundation organizes events for international audiences to generate funds for charitable causes, such as HIV/AIDS charities, financial aid, and medical/social services to persons suffering from HIV/AIDS in Montreal. BBCM donates a portion of its proceeds in support of activities of LGBT community groups.

These activities are a celebration of lifestyle and culture of the gay community. Black & Blue is the biggest of the five annual events that BBCM organizes.

Establishment and progress
The first year event, named Black & Blue, attracted 800 people. Through the years, this event has grown and attracted a global following with an average of 60,000 to 75,000 participants. Fondation BBCM has donated over $1,400,000 to different charities.

Annual events
BBCM organizes 5 annual events as follows:

References

External links
BBCM Official website
Fondation BBCM - Festival Black & Blue site

LGBT culture in Montreal
LGBT organizations in Canada